The 2008 IIHF World Championship Division III Qualification tournament was held on February 15 – 17, 2008 at the Olympic Hall Zetra in Sarajevo, Bosnia and Herzegovina. The winner of the tournament, Greece, advanced to the Division III tournament.

Bosnia and Herzegovina debuted at the IIHF World Championships and Greece made their first appearance since the 1999 tournament.

Armenia forfeits both of its games 
The directorate of the IIHF World Championship Division III qualification decided that both games of Armenia would be forfeited and count as 5–0 wins for its opponents, Greece and Bosnia and Herzegovina.

Armenia refused to show the passports of its players on four occasions until its first game was in progress. Originally, Armenia lost to Greece 8–5 on Saturday and won against Bosnia and Herzegovina, 18–1. Even without the forfeit, Greece earned the promotion outright to this year’s World Championship Division III with two victories on the ice.

Games 
All times local.

Standings

External links
Division III Qualification at the IIHF

2008 IIHF Men's World Ice Hockey Championships
2008 Qualification
Ice hockey in Bosnia and Herzegovina
International sports competitions hosted by Bosnia and Herzegovina